Dravya Shah (1559–1570) was the king of the Gorkha Kingdom in Nepal. He was the father of Purna Shah, king of Gorkha.
Dravya Shah's accomplices were Bhagirath Panta, Ganesh Pandey, Narayan Arjyal, Sarveshwar Khanal, Keshav Bohora, Murti Khawas, Gangaram Rana Busal, all of whom belonged to Gorkha and knew all areas, ins and outs of the region. Narayan Arjyal was Drabya's Guru spiritual tutor. Ganesh Pandey and Bhagirath Panta were minister and commander-in-chief, respectively. Sarveshwar Khanal was royal pandit.

References

Gurkhas
1570 deaths
People from Lamjung District
16th-century Nepalese people
Nepalese Hindus